SS Francis Scott Key was a Liberty ship built in the United States during World War II. She was named after Francis Scott Key, an American lawyer, author, and amateur poet from Frederick, Maryland, who is best known for writing the lyrics for the American national anthem "The Star-Spangled Banner".

Construction
Francis Scott Key was laid down on 21 June 1941, under a Maritime Commission (MARCOM) contract, MCE hull 16, by the Bethlehem-Fairfield Shipyard, Baltimore, Maryland; and was launched on 15 November 1941.

History
Francis Scott Key was allocated to Lykes Brothers Steamship Company, on 29 January 1942. On 20 October 1949, she was laid up in the National Defense Reserve Fleet, Astoria, Oregon. On 22 June 1954, she was withdrawn from the fleet to be loaded with grain under the "Grain Program 1954", she returned loaded on 9 July 1954. On 14 March 1957, Francis Scott Key was withdrawn to be unload, she returned empty 19 March 1957. She was sold for scrapping on 14 August 1967, to Zidell Explorations, Inc., for $54,001. She was removed from the fleet, 29 August 1967.

References

Bibliography

 
 
 
 

 

Liberty ships
Ships built in Baltimore
1941 ships
Astoria Reserve Fleet
Astoria Reserve Fleet Grain Program